Sungkai is a mukim in Batang Padang District, Postcode 35600 Perak, Malaysia. It is accessible via the North–South Expressway's Sungkai Interchange.

Geography
Sungkai spans over an area of 698 km2 with a population of 32,700 people.

Neighbourhood Gardens
 Taman Okid Jaya
 Taman Syarikat Melayu
 Taman Bakti
 Taman Sungkai Perdana
 Taman Permai

Attractions
 Sungai Klah Hot Spring Park
 Sungkai National Wildlife Rescue Center

References

Batang Padang District
Mukims of Perak